The Owl River is a river in the Hudson Bay drainage basin in census division 23 in Northern Manitoba, Canada. It flows from Fly Lake to Hudson Bay.

The river is crossed at the community of Herchmer, the location of Herchmer railway station, by the Hudson Bay Railway. Herchmer railway station is served by the Via Rail Winnipeg – Churchill train.

A large portion of the river from its mouth upstream is part of Wapusk National Park.

See also
List of rivers of Manitoba

References

Rivers of Northern Manitoba
Tributaries of Hudson Bay